The 2017–18 IBSF Bobsleigh North American Cup was a multi-race series over a season for bobsleigh. The season started on 5 November 2017 in Whistler, Canada and ended on 14 January 2018 in Lake Placid, USA. The North American Cup is organised by the IBSF (formerly the FIBT) as a second tier of bobsleigh competitions ranking below the World Cup.

Calendar

Note: Double races were held at each round for all disciplines.

Results

Two-man

Four-man

Two-woman

Standings

Two-man 
(J) – Junior competitor.

Four-man

Two-woman

References

External links 
 IBSF Website

Bobsleigh in the United States
2017 in bobsleigh
2018 in bobsleigh
Bobsleigh in Canada
Bobsleigh competitions